Crisol Celeste Caraballo Carreño best known as Crisol Carabal (born 11 January 1971) is a Venezuelan television and theater actress known for her roles in telenovelas.

Career
Crisol began her artistic career through reciting poems on a television show called Cuánto Vale el Show transmitted by RCTV, and started her acting career by obtaining small roles in RCTV telenovelas. She was trained in acting by actress  and through this, she obtained her first acting role in the telenovela Abigail where she played the role of Charito, the best friend of the titular character played by Catherine Fulop. The telenovela became a major hit that year and was transmitted in various countries around the world.

In 1995, she obtained her first starring role in the telenovela Ilusiones alongside  Vicente Tepedino.

In 2006, she played the villain in Venevisión's telenovela Los Querendones where she played the cold hearted OB/GYN Dr. Gloria Millares. She recorded several telenovelas with Venevisión in the following years namely Aunque mal paguen and La vida entera. She then relocated to Canary Islands, Spain with her husband, magician Mago Sandro.

In 2012, Crisol returned to Venezuela to participate in the telenovela Mi ex me tiene ganas to play the villain Amanda Atenas.

Personal life
Her father is the poet Alejandro Caraballo. Since 2007 she is married to Alessandro Nerilli a magician. In 1997, Crisol was diagnosed with a brain tumor and underwent surgery which was successfully removed.

Telenovelas
1988: [[Selva María]] as Daniela
1988: Abigail as Charito
1992: Por Estas Calles as Bettysabel 
1993: Dulce Ilusión as Sarita
1994: Pura Sangre as Yomira Sarmiento 
1995: Ilusiones as Marisol Palacios
1997: Maria de los Angeles as Alba Griselda Basanta Vargas
1998: Luisa Fernanda (telenovela) as Miriam Linares 
2000: Mariú as Amanda Galvez Escorza
2000: Angelica pecado as Veronica
2002: Mambo y canela as Lolita
2003: Trapos íntimos as Angela Chacón 
2004: Estrambotica Anastasia as Gregoria Borosfky 
2005: Ser Bonita No Basta as Michelle
2006: Los Querendones as Gloria Millares
2007: Aunque mal paguen as Malinka
2008: La vida entera as Titina San Juan
2012: Mi ex me tiene ganas as Amanda Atenas

Films
2003: La señora de Cárdenas as Angélica

Theater
2004: Confesiones de Mujeres de 30
2009: ¿Estás ahí?

References

External links
 
 Crisol Carabal una actriz polifacética at www.magazine.com.ve

1971 births
Living people
Venezuelan film actresses
Venezuelan telenovela actresses
Actresses from Caracas